Eric John Schafer (born September 20, 1977) is a retired American mixed martial artist. A professional from 1997 until 2016, he competed for the UFC.

Background
Schafer attended the University of Wisconsin–Oshkosh.

Schafer is a black belt in Brazilian Jiu-Jitsu under Pedro Sauer.

Mixed martial arts career

Early career
Schafer compiled an amateur record of 2-1 before making his professional MMA debut in 1998. He then amassed a record of 6-1-2 before being signed by the UFC.

Ultimate Fighting Championship
He made his UFC debut at UFC 62, defeating Rob MacDonald by arm-triangle choke, rendering him unconscious at the 2:26 mark of round one.

Schafer then lost his next 2 bouts consecutively via TKO to Michael Bisping at UFC 66 and Stephan Bonnar at UFC 77.

Schafer next defeated Houston Alexander by arm-triangle choke in the first round on September 17, 2008 at UFC Fight Night: Diaz vs Neer.

Schafer won via TKO over Antonio Mendes at UFC 93 on January 7, 2009.

He lost to Ryan Bader by unanimous decision (30–27, 29–26, and 30–27) on October 24, 2009 on the undercard of UFC 104.

Schafer was defeated by Jason Brilz via unanimous decision on March 21, 2010, at UFC Live: Vera vs. Jones. After this bout he was released from the promotion.

Post UFC
In his first fight since being released from the UFC and his first fight at Middleweight Schafer defeated Chris Albandia via submission (triangle choke) in the first round at XFO 41 - Outdoor War 7 on September 3, 2011.

Return to the UFC
Schafer returned to the UFC in a Middleweight bout against Aaron Simpson at UFC 136 on October 8, 2011, and lost a unanimous decision.

Schafer next faced Jorge Rivera on January 20, 2012 at UFC on FX 1.  He lost the fight via TKO in the second round. He was released from the promotion for the third time following this loss.

Independent promotions
After being released from the UFC, Schafer faced John Poppie at Madtown Throwdown 29: Unstoppable on January 5, 2013. He won via second round TKO.

He then fought Eric Hammerich for Chosen Few FC 6, in Madison Wisconsin on 09/19/15. He would win by choke in 2:38 of the first round.

His next fight would be his retirement fight against James Austen Heidlage for Choose Few FC 8, in Madison Wisconsin on 04/16/16. Eric would lose by referee stoppage at 3:01 of the second round.

Championships and accomplishments
Gladiators Fighting Series
GFS Light Heavyweight Championship (One time)
Xtreme Fighting Organization
XFO Light Heavyweight Championship (One time)

Mixed martial arts record

|-
| Loss
| align=center| 15–8–2
| James Austen Heidlage
| TKO (referee stoppage)
| Chosen Few FC 8
| 
| align=center| 2
| align=center| 3:01
| Madison, Wisconsin, United States
| 
|-
| Win
| align=center| 15–7–2
| Eric Hammerich
| Submission (choke)
| Chosen Few FC 6
| 
| align=center| 1
| align=center| 4:07
| Madison, Wisconsin, United States
| 
|-
| Win
| align=center| 14–7–2
| John Poppie
| TKO (punches)
| Madtown Throwdown 29: Unstoppable
| 
| align=center| 1
| align=center| 2:38
| Madison, Wisconsin, United States
| 
|-
| Loss
| align=center| 13–7–2
| Jorge Rivera
| TKO (punches)
| UFC on FX: Guillard vs. Miller
| 
| align=center| 2
| align=center| 1:31
| Nashville, Tennessee, United States
| 
|-
| Loss
| align=center| 13–6–2
| Aaron Simpson
| Decision (unanimous)
| UFC 136
| 
| align=center| 3
| align=center| 5:00
| Houston, Texas, United States
| 
|-
| Win
| align=center| 13–5–2
| Chris Albandia
| Submission (triangle choke)
| XFO 41: Outdoor War 7
| 
| align=center| 1
| align=center| 1:41
| Island Lake, Illinois, United States
| 
|-
| Loss
| align=center| 12–5–2
| Jason Brilz
| Decision (unanimous)
| UFC Live: Vera vs. Jones
| 
| align=center| 3
| align=center| 5:00
| Broomfield, Colorado, United States
| 
|-
| Loss
| align=center| 12–4–2
| Ryan Bader
| Decision (unanimous)
| UFC 104
| 
| align=center| 3
| align=center| 5:00
| Los Angeles, California, United States
| 
|-
| Win
| align=center| 12–3–2
| Antonio Mendes
| TKO (punches)
| UFC 93
| 
| align=center| 1
| align=center| 3:35
| Dublin, Ireland
| 
|-
| Win
| align=center| 11–3–2
| Houston Alexander
| Submission (arm-triangle choke)
| UFC Fight Night: Diaz vs Neer
| 
| align=center| 1
| align=center| 4:53
| Omaha, Nebraska, United States
| 
|-
| Win
| align=center| 10–3–2
| William Hill
| TKO (punches)
| GFS: Thunderdome
| 
| align=center| 1
| align=center| 2:52
| Milwaukee, Wisconsin, United States
| 
|-
| Win
| align=center| 9–3–2
| Ryan Antle
| Submission (guillotine choke)
| GFS: The Warriors
| 
| align=center| 1
| align=center| 0:41
| Wisconsin, United States
| 
|-
| Loss
| align=center| 8–3–2
| Stephan Bonnar
| TKO (punches)
| UFC 77
| 
| align=center| 2
| align=center| 2:47
| Cincinnati, Ohio, United States
| 
|-
| Loss
| align=center| 8–2–2
| Michael Bisping
| TKO (punches)
| UFC 66: Liddell vs. Ortiz
| 
| align=center| 1
| align=center| 4:24
| Las Vegas, Nevada, United States
| 
|-
| Win
| align=center| 8–1–2
| Rob MacDonald
| Technical Submission (arm-triangle choke)
| UFC 62: Liddell vs. Sobral
| 
| align=center| 1
| align=center| 2:26
| Las Vegas, Nevada, United States
| 
|-
| Win
| align=center| 7–1–2
| William Hill
| Submission (triangle choke)
| Xtreme Fighting Organization 9
| 
| align=center| 1
| align=center| 2:37
| Lakemoor, Illinois, United States
| 
|-
| Win
| align=center| 6–1–2
| Jason Veach
| Submission (choke)
| Duneland Classic 2
| 
| align=center| 1
| align=center| N/A
| Portage, Indiana, United States
| 
|-
| Win
| align=center| 5–1–2
| Jason Guida
| Submission (triangle choke)
| XFO 6: Judgement Day
| 
| align=center| 1
| align=center| 3:49
| Lakemoor, Illinois, United States
| 
|-
| Loss
| align=center| 4–1–2
| Dustin Denes
| Submission (kimura)
| HOOKnSHOOT: Overdrive
| 
| align=center| 1
| align=center| N/A
| Evansville, Indiana, United States
| 
|-
| Draw
| align=center| 4–0–2
| Jim Desouza
| Draw
| HOOKnSHOOT: Kings 2
| 
| align=center| 2
| align=center| 5:00
| Evansville, Indiana, United States
| 
|-
| Draw
| align=center| 4–0–1
| Paul Ivens
| Draw
| HOOKnSHOOT: Millennium
| 
| align=center| 1
| align=center| 15:00
| Evansville, Indiana, United States
| 
|-
| Win
| align=center| 4–0
| Steve Martin
| Submission (strikes)
| Cage Combat 4
| 
| align=center| 1
| align=center| 4:13
| Green Bay, Wisconsin, United States
| 
|-
| Win
| align=center| 3–0
| Duane Franzen
| Decision
| Midwest Shootfighting 1
| 
| align=center| 1
| align=center| 10:00
| Clinton, Iowa, United States
| 
|-
| Win
| align=center| 2–0
| John Lowey
| N/A
| Midwest Shootfighting 1
| 
| align=center| 1
| align=center| 3:59
| Clinton, Iowa, United States
| 
|-
| Win
| align=center| 1–0
| Ryan Apolonario
| Submission (choke)
| Fight Sheet Ultimate MMA
| 
| align=center| 1
| align=center| N/A
| Milwaukee, Wisconsin, United States
|

References

External links
 
 

American male mixed martial artists
Mixed martial artists utilizing Brazilian jiu-jitsu
Living people
Sportspeople from Milwaukee
1977 births
Mixed martial artists from Wisconsin
Sportspeople from Fond du Lac, Wisconsin
University of Wisconsin–Oshkosh alumni
Ultimate Fighting Championship male fighters
American practitioners of Brazilian jiu-jitsu
People awarded a black belt in Brazilian jiu-jitsu